A hulder (or huldra) is a seductive forest creature found in Scandinavian folklore. Her name derives from a root meaning "covered" or "secret". In Norwegian folklore, she is known as huldra ("the [archetypal] hulder", though folklore presupposes that there is an entire Hulder race and not just a single individual). Her name suggests that she is originally the same being as the völva divine figure Huld and the German Holda.

The word hulder is only used of a female; a "male hulder" is called a huldrekall and also appears in Norwegian folklore. This being is closely related to other underground dwellers, usually called tusser (sg., tusse).

Though described as beautiful, the huldra is noted for having a distinctive inhuman feature—an animal's tail (usually a cow's or a fox's) and/or a back resembling a hollowed-out tree.

Folklore

The hulder is one of several rå (keeper, warden), including the aquatic sjörå or havsfru, later identified with a mermaid, and the bergsrå in caves and mines who made life tough for the poor miners.

More information can be found in the collected Norwegian folktales of Peter Christen Asbjørnsen and Jørgen Moe.

Relations with humans

The hulders were held to be kind to charcoal burners, watching their charcoal kilns while they rested. Knowing that she would wake them if there were any problems, they were able to sleep, and in exchange they left provisions for her in a special place. A tale from Närke illustrates further how kind a hulder could be, especially if treated with respect (Hellström 1985:15).

Toponyms

A multitude of places in Scandinavia are named after the Hulders, often places by legend associated with the presence of the "hidden folk". Here are some examples showing the wide distribution of Hulder-related toponyms between the northern and southern reaches of Scandinavia, and the terms usage in different language groups' toponyms.

Danish
 Huldremose (Hulder Bog) is a bog on Djursland, Denmark famous for the discovery of the Huldremose Woman, a bog body from 55BC.

Norwegian
 Hulderheim is southeast on the island Karlsøya, Troms, Norway. The name means "Home of the Hulder".
 Hulderhusan is an area on the southwest of Norway's largest island Hinnøya, whose name means "Houses of the Hulders".

Sámi
 Ulddaidvárri in Kvænangen, Troms (Norway) means "Mountain of the Hulders" in North Sámi.
 Ulddašvággi is a valley southwest of Alta in Finnmark, Norway. The name means "Hulder Valley" in North Sámi. The peak guarding the pass over from the valley to the mountains above has a similar name, Ruollačohkka, meaning "Troll Mountain"—and the large mountain presiding over the valley on its northern side is called Háldi, which is a term similar to the above-mentioned Norwegian rå, that is a spirit or local deity which rules a specific area.

In Popular Culture
In the mobile game Year Walk, one of the Watchers is a Huldra.

They are mentioned in Seanan MacGuire's October Daye series in the book "A red-rose chain".

Neil Gaiman's novella The Monarch of the Glen, published in the collection Fragile Things, includes references to Hulder legends.

In the subsequent Year Walk: Bedtime Stories for Awful Children, the first chapter is devoted to the Huldra.

See also

References

Scandinavian legendary creatures
Germanic paganism
German folklore
Norwegian folklore
Scandinavian folklore
Swedish folklore
Mythic humanoids
Nature spirits
Female legendary creatures